The Chrysler LHS is a full-size luxury four-door sedan that was produced by Chrysler for the 1994 through the 2001 model years, with a one-year hiatus for 1998. It replaced the Chrysler Imperial and the Chrysler Fifth Avenue as the division's flagship model. The LHS was continued for the 2002 model year as the Concorde Limited.

First generation (1994 to 1997)

Introduced in May 1993 for the 1994 model year, the Chrysler LHS was the top of the line model for the division, as well as the most expensive of the Chrysler LH platform cars. All the LH-series models shared a  wheelbase and were developed using Chrysler's new computer drafting system.

The car was differentiated from the division's New Yorker sedan by its bucket leather seats (the New Yorker had a bench seat) and standard features such as alloy wheels that were options on the New Yorker. Further differences between the Chrysler LHS and its New Yorker counterpart were a floor console and shifter, five-passenger seating, lack of chrome trim, an upgraded interior, and a sportier image. From the 1996 model year on the New Yorker was dropped in favor of a six-passenger option on the LHS. The LHS received a minor face change in 1995 when the corporate-wide Pentastar emblem was replaced with the revived Chrysler brand emblem.

Standard features of the LHS included a 3.5 L EGE 24-valve  V6 engine, body-colored grille, side mirrors and trim, traction control, aluminum wheels, integrated fog lights, 8-way power-adjustable front seats, premium sound systems with amplifiers, and automatic temperature control. Unlike the New Yorker, leather seats were standard.

Annual changes
 MY 1995: Due to complaints Chrysler received regarding poor brightness of the headlamps on 1994 models, they were redesigned for the 1995 model year and included a projector-style headlight beam, which was rather uncommon for its time. A new Chrysler medallion on the grille replaced the Pentastar.
 MY 1996: Body-color mirrors were no longer available, as well as the optional carphone. With the withdrawal of the New Yorker, front bench seats became optional. Homelink garage door opener and a hidden antenna became standard equipment.
 MY 1997: Transmission improvements were the primary change for 1997.
Production Figures:

Second generation (1999 to 2001)

After a one-year hiatus, a redesigned LHS was introduced in 1998 for MY1999. It featured the new winged emblem of the Chrysler division. With the introduction of the 300M and the discontinuation of the New Yorker, the second generation LHS competed with traditional large luxury sedans while the shorter and sportier 300M competed in the performance luxury market.

Chrysler discontinued the LHS after 2001, replacing it with the new Concorde Limited. The Concorde's fascias, the primary exterior difference between the Concorde and LHS, were replaced with the LHS'. In essence, the LHS was rebadged as the Concorde Limited allowing Chrysler to streamline its model lineup.

Europe
The first-generation LHS was sold in Europe by special order only during 1995–1999 model years. LHS was rebranded as New Yorker for the European market but retained the LHS name for the United Kingdom.

The New Yorker featured the export taillights with amber turn signal indicators in the middle band between red brake and night lights and white reverse lights, side turn signal repeaters, headlights with different light output and bulbs, and a set of red rear fog lamps in the bumpers adjacent to the wider numberplate. The side running lights and retroreflective markers were deleted from the bumpers and front turn signal indicators.

Legacy
The first generation LHS was praised by motoring journalist Jeremy Clarkson, who is well known for criticizing American automobiles, described the LHS as "by global standards, right up there with the best." The LHS nameplate was discontinued after 2002, but the design continued as the Concorde Limited.

References

External links

 

LHS
Front-wheel-drive vehicles
Full-size vehicles
Luxury vehicles
Sedans
2000s cars
Cars introduced in 1993